Åsmund Romstad Løvik (born 1 May 1989) is a Norwegian racing cyclist. He competed in the men's team time trial event at the 2017 UCI Road World Championships.

Major results
2014
 5th Hadeland GP
2016
 3rd Sundvolden GP
 10th Overall Tour de Hongrie
2017
 2nd Overall Tour of Rhodes

References

External links

1989 births
Living people
Norwegian male cyclists
Sportspeople from Bærum